Coast FM is a local radio station in Westport, New Zealand, to most of the West Coast Region. The station began in 1995 as Radio Fifeshire Westport in partnership with Fifeshire FM in Nelson, and started broadcasting in Hokitika and Greymouth in 1996. The station was rebranded as Coast FM in 1999, but is not related to Coast network that broadcasts in other parts of the country. It used to broadcast from the Westport News offices (1995 - 2012) in the former BNZ building on Palmerston Street.

The station's main programmes include; 

 Early Morning Wake Up with Lisa Pattinson 

 Late Late Breakfast Show with Dave Williamson 

 Night Café with Jason Mac 

 Night Zone with Danny Cockfield 

 Saturday Morning Sports Show with Barry Townrow.

The station broadcasts mid-morning trade and exchange notices, cancellation notices for Sunset Speedway, and live commentaries of Poverty Bay Rugby Football Union and Buller Rugby Football Union games. On Sunday mornings it broadcasts The Great Big Kids Show with Suzy Cato, and country music programme West Coast Country with Barb Berry.

Stations 
Coast FM broadcasts on the following frequencies:

 Grey Valley: 99.5 FM
 Greymouth: 97.9 FM
 Hokitika: 100.3 FM
 Karamea: 99.3 FM
 Murchison: 87.8 FM
 Reefton: 90.3 FM
 Haast :94.5 FM
 Westport: 96.5 FM

References

External links
 Coast FM website

Mass media in Westport, New Zealand
Coast FM
West Coast, New Zealand